Two referendums were held in Taiwan on 12 January 2008, alongside legislative elections. One (officially numbered as Question 3) concerned transitional justice and the treatment of contentious properties acquired by the Kuomintang, whilst a counter-referendum (Question 4) was initiated by the Kuomintang on alleged corruption in politics.

Although a majority of voters voted in favour of both proposals, voter turnout was only 26%, well below the 50% required to make the results valid. The legislative elections had a turnout of around 58%.

Questions

Proposal 3
This question was officially championed by former premier Yu Shyi-kun.

Proposal 4
This question was officially championed by former finance minister Wang Chien-shien.

Campaign
The Kuomintang urged voters to boycott both referendums to prevent them from reaching the 50% voter turnout needed to for validate the result, and there was much pre-election controversy over the format and structure of the balloting.  Initially, the Kuomintang was in favor of a two-step balloting system where voters would vote for the legislative elections and then for the referendum, while the DPP was in favor of a one-step system in which voters would get all four ballots to vote. The final system was a one-step, two-table system in which voters would get the ballots at separate tables but would mark the ballot papers together.

Results

References

External links
 Ballot specimens from the Central Election Commission
 Official bulletin on the referendums and the legislative election
 Results of the two referendum questions from the Central Election Commission
 Government Information Office explanation on the referendum

Transitional justice referendum
2008 referendums
2008 transitional justice
Transitional justice